Gertrud Hinz (8 July 1912 – 1 September 1996) was a German film editor. She was married to the cinematographer Theo Nischwitz and was sometimes credited as Gertrud Hinz-Nischwitz. She edited more than sixty films and television series during her career. In the Nazi era she edited the anti-British adventure film Uproar in Damascus (1939) and the war film Bloodbrotherhood (1941).

Selected filmography
 Ride to Freedom (1937)
 The Man Who Was Sherlock Holmes (1937)
 Tango Notturno (1937)
 Secret Code LB 17 (1938)
The Secret Lie (1938)
 Uproar in Damascus (1939)
 Bloodbrotherhood (1941)
 Mask in Blue (1943)
 Circus Renz (1943)
 Beloved Darling (1943)
 Music in Salzburg (1944)
 The Murder Trial of Doctor Jordan (1949)
 Regimental Music (1950)
 The Last Shot (1951)
 Turtledove General Delivery (1952)
 House of Life (1952)
 Towers of Silence (1952)
 Marriage for One Night (1953)
 A Parisian in Rome (1954)
 The Fisherman from Heiligensee (1955)
 The Golden Bridge (1956)
 My Husband's Getting Married Today (1956)
 The Ideal Woman (1959)
 I Learned That in Paris (1960)
 Life Begins at Eight (1962)

References

Bibliography 
 Giesen, Rolf. Nazi propaganda films. McFarland & Co, 2003.

External links 
 

1912 births
1996 deaths
German film editors
Film people from Berlin
German women film editors